Arnold Waites (October 20, 1914 – August 24, 1963) is an American former Negro league pitcher who played in the 1930s. 

A native of Bastrop County, Texas, Waites made his Negro leagues debut in 1935 with the Philadelphia Stars. He went on to play for the Homestead Grays the following season, and finished his career in 1937 with the Grays and the Washington Elite Giants. Waites died in Nashville, Tennessee in 1963 at age 48.

References

External links
 and Seamheads

1914 births
1963 deaths
Homestead Grays players
Philadelphia Stars players
Washington Elite Giants players
Baseball pitchers
Baseball players from Texas
People from Bastrop County, Texas